Patrick Francis O'Connor (August 4, 1879 – August 17, 1950), was an Irish born Major League Baseball player who played catcher from  to . He played for the Pittsburgh Pirates, St. Louis Cardinals, New York Yankees, and Pittsburgh Rebels.

External links

Major League Baseball catchers
Major League Baseball players from Ireland
Irish baseball players
Sportspeople from County Kerry
Pittsburgh Pirates players
Pittsburgh Rebels players
St. Louis Cardinals players
New York Yankees players
New York Yankees coaches
1879 births
1950 deaths
Minor league baseball managers
Bristol Bell Makers players
Springfield Ponies players
Kansas City Blues (baseball) players
Hartford Senators players
Hutchinson Salt Packers players
Oklahoma City Indians players
Albany Senators players
Irish emigrants to the United States (before 1923)